Trochoderma is a genus of sea cucumbers. It is monotypic, with a single species Trochoderma elegans.

References

Holothuroidea genera
Myriotrochidae